UFO is a 2018 American science fiction film written and directed by Ryan Eslinger, and starring Gillian Anderson and Alex Sharp. The story focuses on college student Derek Echevaro's attempts to prove the existence of extraterrestrials with assistance from his mathematics professor, Dr. Hendricks.

Plot 
Derek Echevaro believes that, when he was younger, he saw a UFO. A UFO incident at the Cincinnati International Airport in 2017 motivates him to prove the existence of UFOs being of extraterrestrial origin. As a college student he seeks assistance from his girlfriend, Natalie, and mathematics professor, Dr. Hendricks.

In conclusion, the protagonist resolves UFO's mathematical riddles, and gets to a place to briefly see the UFO again. Right away, he gets detained by government forces who tell him they are already aware of aliens, have resolved some of their riddles, but they appear to be far more complicated and there are far more to resolve.

Cast 

 Alex Sharp as Derek Echevaro
 Gillian Anderson as Dr. Hendricks
 Ella Purnell as Natalie
 David Strathairn as Franklin Ahls
 Benjamin Beatty as Lee
 Cece Abbey as Cecelia Abbey (Young Girl)
 Ken Early as Dave Ellison
 Brian Bowman as Roland Junger

Release 
The film was released directly to video on September 4, 2018. Sony released a trailer on "UFO Day". The film has been described as delving "into math of universe navigation".

Nigel Watson of Starburst gave the film 5 out of 10 stars stating it was "all done in Spielberg's Close Encounters of the Third Kind, UFO promotes further study of the fine-structure constant to give us a leg-up in the hierarchy of civilisations and that’s as good as it gets".

See also 
2006 O'Hare International Airport UFO sighting
List of American films of 2018

References

External links 
 
 

2018 films
Unidentified flying objects
Ufology
Cincinnati/Northern Kentucky International Airport
American science fiction action films
2010s English-language films
2010s American films
2018 science fiction films